Dr. Phil is an American talk show created by Oprah Winfrey and the host Phil McGraw. After McGraw's segments on The Oprah Winfrey Show, Dr. Phil debuted on September 16, 2002. On both shows, McGraw offers advice in the form of "life strategies" from his life experience as a clinical and forensic psychologist. The show is in syndication throughout the United States and several other countries. Occasional prime-time specials have aired on CBS.

The executive producers are Phil McGraw and showrunner Oprah Winfrey. It is a production of Peteski Productions and distributed by CBS Media Ventures. Harpo Productions co-produced the series until 2010, with Paramount Domestic Television and its successor, CBS Paramount Domestic Television, serving as secondary co-producers until 2007. It was originally distributed by King World Productions.

The program is recorded before a live studio audience in Stage 29 on the Paramount Pictures lot in Hollywood, California. It is recorded from August through to May with a break in December for the holiday season. On October 25, 2018, it was announced that Dr. Phil had been renewed for four additional seasons, taking the show to May 2023, or the end of its 21st season, which would be confirmed to be its last in January of that year.

History
The Dr. Phil show premiered on September 16, 2002. Before starting the show, McGraw had made regular appearances as a guest on The Oprah Winfrey Show.

Since September 2008, Dr. Phil has been broadcast in HDTV with a revamped look and a theme written and performed by McGraw's son, Jordan. Its tenth season premiered on September 12, 2011. Reruns of earlier episodes of the series began broadcasting on the Oprah Winfrey Network in January 2011.

Since 2011, Dr. Phil has ranked as the top syndicated talk show, before that it was the second highest-rated talk show after The Oprah Winfrey Show. In October 2015, it was reported that Dr. Phil had been renewed through 2020.

McGraw's advice and methods have drawn much criticism from psychotherapists as well as from laypersons. McGraw said in a 2001 South Florida newspaper interview that he never liked traditional one-on-one counseling, and that "I'm not the Hush-Puppies, pipe and 'Let's talk about your mother' kind of psychologist." In 2004, the National Alliance on Mental Illness called McGraw's conduct in one episode of his television show "unethical" and "incredibly irresponsible". McGraw's critics regard advice given by him to be at best simplistic, and at worst, ineffective.

On April 13, 2008, an unnamed staffer for Dr. Phil put up 10%, or a total of $3,300 towards the $33,000 bail for 17-year-old Mercades Nichols, one of a group of eight teenage girls who beat another girl and videotaped the attack. Someone put up the remaining 90% of the bail for Nichols, who had been booked at the Polk County, Florida, jail. Theresa Corigliano, spokesperson for the Dr. Phil show said that "In this case certain staffers went beyond our guidelines," and that the producers had "decided not to go forward with the story as our guidelines have been compromised."

Shelley Duvall, who was reportedly suffering from mental illness, appeared on a segment on the show in 2016. It drew significant criticism from the public, with many suggesting that Duvall's mental illness was being exploited. In the segment, she refused the offered treatment.

On October 25, 2018, it was announced that Dr. Phil had been renewed for four additional seasons, for a total of 21 seasons, ending in May 2023.

In February 2022, around a dozen current and former employees of Dr. Phil alleged that they experienced "verbal abuse in a workplace that fosters fear, intimidation, and racism". Seven current employees also claimed that the show's guests are often manipulated and treated unethically. Attorneys for McGraw and his co-producer, Carla Pennington, categorically denied every allegation made.

On January 31, 2023, CBS Media Ventures confirmed Dr. Phil will cease production of new episodes with the current season, ending its run at 21 seasons. The distributor will offer stations re-runs through the end of their contract to carry the program.

Format
The show covers a wide variety of topics including weight loss, financial planning, grief, dysfunctional families, marriage counselling, rebellious teenagers, child stars, and support for charitable causes.

Guests on the show sometimes undergo polygraph tests. These tests were usually administered by retired FBI agent Jack Trimarco, who was a frequent guest on the show until he died in 2018. After Trimarco's death, he was replaced by polygraph examiner John Leo Grogan. McGraw is noted for often bringing families back on multiple shows for follow-up "therapy" sessions in his segment called "Dr. Phil Family."

Reception

Ratings
On May 21, 2007, the Dr. Phil show was ranked 4th by Nielsen Media Research, with 6.69 million viewers. The show was ranked 6th with 5.69 million viewers on May 12, 2008.  In May 2008, Dr. Phil was the second most popular talk show on television, after The Oprah Winfrey Show.

On July 30, 2019, Dr. Phil was the top syndicated show with a 2.9 national Nielsen rating, ranking first among talk shows for the 150th consecutive week. The Dr. Phil show was the highest rated talk show in the first week of March 2020, with a 2.8 national Nielsen rating.

Accolades

References

External links

2000s American television talk shows
2002 American television series debuts
2010s American television talk shows
2020s American television talk shows
American television spin-offs
English-language television shows
First-run syndicated television programs in the United States
Television productions suspended due to the COVID-19 pandemic
Television series by CBS Studios
Television series by Harpo Productions
Television series by King World Productions